Kan Tau Tsuen is a village of Hong Kong, located in Fanling, North District.

Administration
Kan Tau Tsuen is a recognized village under the New Territories Small House Policy. It is one of the villages represented within the Fanling District Rural Committee. For electoral purposes, Kan Tau Tsuen is part of the Queen's Hill constituency, which is currently represented by Law Ting-tak.

References

External links

 Delineation of area of existing village Kan Tau Tsuen (Fanling) for election of resident representative (2019 to 2022)
 Antiquities Advisory Board. Historic Building Appraisal. Law Ancestral Hall, Kan Tau Tsuen Pictures
 Antiquities Advisory Board. Historic Building Appraisal. Lau Wai Yip Ancestral Hall, Kan Tau Tsuen Pictures

Villages in North District, Hong Kong
Fanling